The 1865 Burnett colonial by-election was a by-election held on 13 May 1865 in the electoral district of Burnett for the Queensland Legislative Assembly.

History
On 15 April 1865, John Edwards, the member for Burnett, resigned. Charles Haly won the resulting by-election on 13 May 1865.

See also
 Members of the Queensland Legislative Assembly, 1863–1867

References

1865 elections in Australia
Queensland state by-elections
1860s in Queensland